Ray of sunshine may refer to:

Crepuscular rays
Ray of Sunshine, 1919 film
"A Ray of Sunshine", song from Fantastic (Wham! album) 
"A Little Ray of Sunshine", a song written by Brian Cadd and Don Mudie and released as a single by Axiom (Australian band) in 1970.
A Little Ray of Sunshine, play by Mark Ambient (1898)

See also
Deò-ghrèine